Nunziata Serradimigni (born 8 February 1960) is an Italian basketball player. She competed in the women's tournament at the 1980 Summer Olympics.

References

External links
 

1960 births
Living people
Italian women's basketball players
Olympic basketball players of Italy
Basketball players at the 1980 Summer Olympics
People from Sassari
Sportspeople from Sardinia
Sardinian women